Brigadier General Robert Freeman Mugabe, is a Ugandan military officer in the Uganda People's Defence Forces (UPDF). Effective 12 July 2022, he is the Chairman of the UPDF General Court Martial, the highest court of military justice in the country. Before that, he served as the  adjutant general of Bombo Military Barracks, the headquarters of the UPDF Land Forces, located in Bombo, Uganda.

Background
He is reported to have joined the National Resistance Army (NRA) in 1985. NRA transformed into what is the Uganda People's Defense Force today. He underwent officer cadet training at what was the Cadet Officer School, in Jinja under Tanzanian military instructors. Today, the Cadet Officer School is part of the Uganda Military Academy, in Kabamba, Uganda. He graduated from there in 1989 as a Second Lieutenant.

Military career
Over the course of the past 30 years, Mugabe has served in several leadership positions in the UPDF and UPDF Air Force including as Air Defence Regiment Commander, Division Training Operations Officer and Division Administrative Officer among others. He also served as a member of the UPDF contingent to Somalia, as part of the AMISOM mission.

He was promoted from Colonel to Brigadier in April 2021 and has served as the adjutant general at the Bombo barracks since 2020. In 2022, he took over as Chairman of the UPDF General Court Martial, from Lieutenant General Andrew Gutti, whose term expired in June 2022. General Gutti retired from the UPDF on 1 September 2022.

Mugabe took over his new appointment on 1 August 2022, in the presence of General Wilson Mbasu Mbadi, the UPDF Chief of Defense Forces. He took the oath of office and assumed office the next day.

See also

References

External links
 New army court boss begins work, cancels suspect’s bail As of 3 August 2022.

People from Western Region, Uganda
Living people
Ankole people
1960s births
Ugandan generals
Ugandan military personnel
Uganda Military Academy alumni